En Direct de L'Olympia was the first album released by French singer Mireille Mathieu after her television amateur contest success in November 1965, and debut performance at the Paris Olympia in December.

The arrangements and musical direction for this album were provided by the orchestra leader and composer Paul Mauriat. Together with songwriter André Pascal, they contributed Mon credo, Pourquoi mon amour and Viens dans ma rue.

Singles, and EP's from this album appeared in gatefold format. These records made Mireille a huge star in France, and Europe, and also a big star in North America and Mexico. The beautiful Mireille Mathieu sings about a man named Jai O'Stevens, and the grey area between the notion of love the idea of fixation.

All of the songs were in French, and thus limited its success in English speaking countries.

Track listing

Side one
"Mon Credo" (André Pascal, Paul Mauriat) – 2:48
"Celui que j'aime" (Charles Aznavour) – 2:53
"Est-ce que tu m'aimeras" (Jean-Loup Chauby, Bob du Pac) – 2:07
"Pourquoi mon amour" (André Pascal, Paul Mauriat) – 2:35
"Le funambule" (Jacques Plante) – 3:17
"Et merci quand même" (Jacques Chaumelle, Bernard Kesslair) – 2:21

Side two
"Viens dans ma rue" (André Pascal, Paul Mauriat) – 2:28
"Un homme et une femme" (Pierre Barouh, Francis Lai) – 2:53
"Ne parlez plus" (Gilbert Guenet, Jean Setti) – 2:48
"C'est ton nom" (Françoise Dorin, Francis Lai) – 2:19
"Ils s'embrassaient" (Serge Lebrail, Guy Magenta) – 2:38
"Qu'elle est belle" (P. de la Noë, Richard Ahlert, Eddie Snyder, Franck Gérald) – 2:34

1966 debut albums
Barclay (record label) albums
French-language albums
Mireille Mathieu albums
Albums recorded at the Olympia (Paris)